Ronda is a city in the Spanish province of Málaga.

Ronda may also refer to:

In geography:
 Ronda, Cebu, Philippines
 Ronda (Illano), Illano, Asturias, Spain
 Ronda, California, United States
 Ronda, North Carolina, United States
Ronda, West Virginia, United States

 Camí de Ronda, a footpath in Catalonia, Spain
 Ronda Alta, Rio Grande do Sul, Brazil
 A Ronda (Boal), Boal, Asturias, Spain
 La Ronda (estate), Bryn Mawr, Pennsylvania, U.S.

In music:
 Ronda (Tango), line of dance in Argentine Tango.

Other uses:
 Ronda do Quarteirão, or simply Ronda, is a Brazilian public safety program 
 SEAT Ronda, a small family car produced by the Spanish automaker SEAT
 Ronda (watchmaker), a Swiss manufacturer of watch movements founded in 1946 and headquartered in Lausen

People with the given name Ronda
 Ronda Curtin (born 1980), American college ice hockey player
 Ronda Jo Miller (born 1978), American deaf basketball and volleyball player 
 Ronda Rousey (born 1987), American judoka and mixed martial artist
 Ronda Rudd Menlove, American politician and university administrator
 Ronda Storms (born 1965), member of the U.S. state Senate of Florida
 Ronda Stryker (born 1954), American billionaire heiress

See also
 Rhonda, given name
 Rhondda (disambiguation)
 Assembly of Ronda
 CD Ronda
 Depression of Ronda
 Plaza de Toros de Ronda
 Ronda Campesina
 Ronda de Sant Pere, Barcelona
 Ronda del Guinardó, Barcelona
 Sella Ronda
 Serranía de Ronda
 Taifa of Ronda